San Antonio is a municipality in the Honduran department of Intibucá.

Demographics
At the time of the 2013 Honduras census, San Antonio municipality had a population of 5,492. Of these, 72.67% were Mestizo, 18.07% Indigenous (17.99% Lenca), 5.30% White, 2.90% Black or Afro-Honduran and 1.06% others.

References

Municipalities of the Intibucá Department